Hamid Mahmoudi (born September 12, 1985) is a former professional Canadian football cornerback who played two seasons for the BC Lions of the Canadian Football League (CFL). He was drafted 20th overall by the Lions in the 2010 CFL Draft and signed a contract with the team on May 25, 2010. He played college football for the Montreal Carabins.

References

External links
BC Lions bio

1985 births
Living people
BC Lions players
Canadian football defensive backs
Montreal Carabins football players
Sportspeople from Tehran
Canadian people of Iranian descent